Allostock is a civil parish in Cheshire West and Chester, England. It contains twelve buildings that are recorded in the National Heritage List for England as designated listed buildings. Of these, two are listed at Grade II*, namely Hulme Hall, and the bridge over its moat. The other buildings are all listed at Grade II. They are all domestic buildings, or related to farming, reflecting the rural nature of the parish.

Key

Buildings

See also
Listed buildings in Byley
Listed buildings in Cranage
Listed buildings in Goostrey
Listed buildings in Lach Dennis
Listed buildings in Nether Peover
Listed buildings in Peover Superior

References
Citations

Sources

Listed buildings in Cheshire West and Chester
Lists of listed buildings in Cheshire